Man of the Year is a 2002 American black comedy film directed by Straw Weisman, starring John Ritter.

Cast
 John Ritter as Bill
 Jade Carter as Jim
 Adria Dawn as Chloe
 Brian Cousins as Phil
 Heidi Mark as Carol
 Idalis DeLeón as Joan
 Clayton Landey as Stuart
 Khrystyne Haje as Vanessa
 Danny Ponce as Mickey
 Lin Shaye as Flora
 Kathleen Gati as Ella
 Leeza Gibbons as The Reporter
 Archie Hahn as Nick
 Amy Hill as The Maid
 Jon Jacobs as Johnathan
 Shawnee Free Jones as Anna
 Samantha Lloyd as Sylvia
 Ivo Lopez as The Butler
 Kristen Miller as Sally
 Jack Mosshammer as Parker
 Oliver Muirhead as Reg
 Annie Sorell as Shauna
 Rebecca Harrell Tickell as Donna
 James Wilder as Vaughn
  as Zarita

Reception
Robert Koehler of Variety wrote that while the cast "proves improvisationally capable", the plot is "rather conventional".

Kevin Thomas of the Los Angeles Times wrote that Weisman "slices and dices his images to such an extent that it takes a lot of time for the story lines and the key characters and their tangled and changing relationships to emerge with any clarity", and that "when it becomes possible to identify the people and keep track of them, they by and large prove to be generic characters rather than distinctive individuals."

References

External links
 
 

American black comedy films
2002 black comedy films
2002 films